Botev Point is the south extremity of both Rozhen Peninsula and Livingston Island in the South Shetland Islands, Antarctica formed by an offshoot of Botev Peak in the Veleka Ridge of Tangra Mountains.

The feature is named after Hristo Botev (1848–1876), poet and leader of the Bulgarian liberation movement.

Location
The point was mapped in 1968 by the UK Directorate of Overseas Surveys, and in 2005 and 2009 by Bulgaria.

Maps
 L.L. Ivanov et al. Antarctica: Livingston Island and Greenwich Island, South Shetland Islands. Scale 1:100000 topographic map. Sofia: Antarctic Place-names Commission of Bulgaria, 2005.
 L.L. Ivanov. Antarctica: Livingston Island and Greenwich, Robert, Snow and Smith Islands. Scale 1:120000 topographic map.  Troyan: Manfred Wörner Foundation, 2009.

References
 Botev Point. SCAR Composite Gazetteer of Antarctica.
 Bulgarian Antarctic Gazetteer. Antarctic Place-names Commission. (details in Bulgarian, basic data in English)

External links
 Botev Point. Copernix satellite image

Headlands of Livingston Island
Bulgaria and the Antarctic